Nahavand County is in Hamadan province, Iran. The capital of the county is the city of Nahavand. At the 2006 census, the county's population was 178,683 in 46,283 households. The following census in 2011 counted 181,711 people in 53,821 households. At the 2016 census, the county's population was 178,787 in 55,542 households.

Administrative divisions

The population history of Nahavand County's administrative divisions over three consecutive censuses is shown in the following table. The latest census shows four districts, nine rural districts, and four cities.

References

 

Counties of Hamadan Province